Guayaramerín Municipality is a municipality of the Beni Department in Bolivia.

References 

 Instituto Nacional de Estadistica de Bolivia

Municipalities of Beni Department